The 1997 San Francisco Giants season was the Giants' 115th season in Major League Baseball, their 40th season in San Francisco since their move from New York following the 1957 season, and their 38th at 3Com Park at Candlestick Point.  The Giants finished in first place in the National League West with a record of 90 wins and 72 losses. They lost the National League Division Series in three games to the Florida Marlins.

Offseason
November 13, 1996: Matt Williams was traded by the San Francisco Giants with a player to be named later to the Cleveland Indians for a player to be named later, Jeff Kent, Julián Tavárez, and José Vizcaíno. The Cleveland Indians sent Joe Roa (December 16, 1996) to the San Francisco Giants to complete the trade.
November 26, 1996: J. T. Snow was traded by the Anaheim Angels to the San Francisco Giants for Allen Watson and Fausto Macey (minors).
December 16, 1996: Trenidad Hubbard was sent by the San Francisco Giants to the Cleveland Indians to complete an earlier deal made on November 13, 1996.
January 6, 1997: Damon Berryhill was signed as a free agent with the San Francisco Giants.

Regular season
June 12 – The first interleague game took place as the Texas Rangers hosted the San Francisco Giants at The Ballpark in Arlington (now Rangers Ballpark in Arlington).

Opening Day starters
 Darryl Hamilton CF
 José Vizcaíno SS
 Glenallen Hill RF
 Barry Bonds LF
 Jeff Kent 2B
 J.T. Snow 1B
 Rick Wilkins C
 Bill Mueller 3B
 Mark Gardner P

Season standings

Record vs. opponents

Roster

Notable transactions
August 8, 1997: William Van Landingham was released by the San Francisco Giants.
August 19, 1997: William Van Landingham was signed as a free agent with the San Francisco Giants.

The White Flag Trade was a trade made in 1997. On July 31, 1997, the Chicago White Sox traded three major players to the San Francisco Giants for six minor leaguers. At the time, the trade was maligned by the vast majority of White Sox fans as Jerry Reinsdorf giving up on the team, as they were only 3.5 games behind the Cleveland Indians for the American League Central Division lead. In 2000, however, the White Sox won the Central Division title, receiving large contributions from two of the players received in this trade.

 The Chicago White Sox received:
Keith Foulke, right-handed pitcher
Bob Howry, right-handed pitcher
Lorenzo Barceló, right-handed pitcher
Ken Vining, left-handed pitcher
Mike Caruso, shortstop
Brian Manning
 The San Francisco Giants received:
Wilson Álvarez, left-handed pitcher
Danny Darwin, right-handed pitcher
Roberto Hernández, right-handed pitcher

Player stats

Batting
Note: Pos = Position; G = Games played; AB = At bats; H = Hits; Avg. = Batting average; HR = Home runs; RBI = Runs batted in

Other batters
Note: G = Games played; AB = At bats; H = Hits; Avg. = Batting average; HR = Home runs; RBI = Runs batted in

Starting pitchers
Note: G = Games pitched; IP = Innings pitched; W = Wins; L = Losses; ERA = Earned run average; SO = Strikeouts

Other pitchersNote: G = Games pitched; IP = Innings pitched; W = Wins; L = Losses; ERA = Earned run average; SO = StrikeoutsRelief pitchersNote: G = Games pitched; W = Wins; L = Losses; SV = Saves; ERA = Earned run average; SO = StrikeoutsNational League Divisional Playoffs

Florida Marlins vs. San Francisco Giants
Florida wins the series, 3-0

Award winners
 J. T. Snow 1B, Willie Mac Award
All-Star Game

Farm system

References

External links
 1997 San Francisco Giants at Baseball Reference 1997 San Francisco Giants at Baseball Almanac''

National League West champion seasons
San Francisco Giants seasons
San Francisco Giants Season, 1997
1997 in San Francisco
San Fran